No. 1 Court is a tennis court at the All England Lawn Tennis and Croquet Club, Wimbledon, London. Opened in 1997, it is used primarily for the Wimbledon Championships. It also occasionally plays host to Great Britain's Davis Cup home ties, as Centre Court is reserved for the Grand Slam tournament, with the one exception of the 2012 Olympic Games.

With a capacity of 12,345, it replaced the original, now-demolished No. 1 Court, which had stood on the west side of Centre Court since 1924, with a spectator capacity of 7,328. The old court was replaced by the Millennium Building, the media centre and facilities for players, members, and officials.

History

Former No. 1 Court
 
The original No. 1 Court was built in 1924 and was attached to the west side of Centre Court. Originally it had a capacity of about 3,250 (2,500 seats and approximately 750 standing) which was increased over the years to 7,328 It was smaller than the current No. 1 Court and was said to have had a unique, more intimate atmosphere, making it a favourite of many players.

The Wightman Cup, an annual team tennis competition for women contested between teams from the United States and Great Britain was held on Court No 1 from 1946 to 1972.

The old court was replaced in 1997 by the current No. 1 Court situated to the north of Centre Court in Aorangi Park. The old No. 1 Court was demolished because its capacity for spectators was too low. The site of the old court is now occupied by the Millennium Building, the media centre, and facilities for players, members, and officials.

Current No. 1 Court

The current No. 1 Court in Aorangi Park was built in 1997, with a spectator capacity of 11,432. It was opened on 23 June 1997 and as part of the opening ceremony a salver was presented to 10 former champions who had won at least three singles titles. The first match played on the new court was between Tim Henman and Daniel Nestor.

Retractable roof

In April 2013, the All England Club confirmed its intention to build a retractable roof over No. 1 Court. As well as a retractable roof, the seating capacity of the court was increased by approximately 1,000 to seat 12,345 people.

The roof was completed in time for the 2019 Championships, with it being unveiled at a celebratory event attended by legendary former players in May 2019. The roof was closed for the first time in a competitive match on 3 July 2019 when Coco Gauff played Magdaléna Rybáriková, the match being moved from an outside court.  The roof was closed again on 4 July 2019 during the Men's Doubles first round match featuring Andy Murray and Pierre-Hugues Herbert.

See also

Centre Court
List of tennis stadiums by capacity

Notes

References

Sources

External links

No. 1 Court tour and information
Photo of the pre-1997 No.1 Court

Sports venues completed in 1997
Tennis venues in London
Wimbledon Championships
Outdoor arenas
Retractable-roof stadiums in Europe